The 2021 Lucas Oil 150 was a NASCAR Camping World Truck Series race that was held on November 5, 2021. It was contested over 150 laps on the  oval. It was the 22nd and final race of the 2021 NASCAR Camping World Truck Series season, as well as the championship race. The 4 drivers in the championship four coming into the race were Zane Smith, John Hunter Nemechek, Ben Rhodes, and Matt Crafton. Kyle Busch Motorsports driver Chandler Smith collected his second win of the season, while 3rd place finisher Ben Rhodes collected the championship.

Report

Background

Phoenix Raceway – also known as PIR – is a one-mile, low-banked tri-oval race track located in Avondale, Arizona. It is named after the nearby metropolitan area of Phoenix. The motorsport track opened in 1964 and currently hosts two NASCAR race weekends annually. PIR has also hosted the IndyCar Series, CART, USAC and the Rolex Sports Car Series. The raceway is currently owned and operated by International Speedway Corporation.

The raceway was originally constructed with a 2.5 mi (4.0 km) road course that ran both inside and outside of the main tri-oval. In 1991 the track was reconfigured with the current 1.51 mi (2.43 km) interior layout. PIR has an estimated grandstand seating capacity of around 67,000. Lights were installed around the track in 2004 following the addition of a second annual NASCAR race weekend.

Entry list 

 (R) denotes rookie driver.
 (i) denotes driver who is ineligible for series driver points.

Practice

Qualifying

Qualifying results

Race

Race results

Stage Results 
Stage One
Laps: 45

Stage Two
Laps: 45

Final Stage Results 

Laps: 60

Race statistics 
 Lead changes: 12 among 3 different drivers
 Cautions/Laps: 4 for 25
 Time of race: 1 hours, 30 minutes, and 34 seconds
 Average speed:

References 

2021 NASCAR Camping World Truck Series
NASCAR races at Phoenix Raceway
2021 in sports in Arizona
Lucas Oil 150